Mary Anissa Jones  (March 11, 1958 – August 28, 1976) was an American child actress known for her role as Buffy Davis on the CBS sitcom Family Affair, which ran from 1966 to 1971. She died from combined drug intoxication when she was 18.

Early life

Jones was born in West Lafayette, Indiana, in 1958 and was raised in Charleston, West Virginia, until the age of 5. Her maternal grandparents were Lebanese and Jones' middle name means "Little Friend" in Arabic. Her parents were divorced prior to the start of her acting career in 1965.

At the time of her birth, Jones' father, John Paul Jones, was an engineering graduate and faculty board member at Purdue University, where her mother, Mary Paula Jones (née Tweel), was a zoology student. Soon after the birth of Anissa's brother John Paul Jones, Jr. (called "Paul" by the family), the family moved to Playa Del Rey, California, where John Paul, Sr. took a job in aerospace engineering and Anissa attended Paseo del Rey Elementary School, then Orville Wright Junior High School.

Career
In 1965, when she was 6, Jones' first TV appearance was in a commercial.  A year later, 8-year-old Jones, who was small for her age, was cast as 6-year-old Ava Elizabeth "Buffy" Patterson-Davis on the CBS sitcom Family Affair (1966). In the sitcom, Buffy, her twin brother Jody (Johnny Whitaker), and older sister Cissy (Kathy Garver) are sent to live with their Uncle Bill (Brian Keith) and his valet Mr. French (Sebastian Cabot) a year after the children's parents die in a car accident (the DVD collection notes mistakenly state "plane accident"). In 1969, Jones made her only film appearance with a small role in The Trouble with Girls which starred Elvis Presley. Jones became a popular child celebrity the same year the TV series became a hit. Jones was 12 when the series ended in 1971.

Death
Shortly before noon on August 28, 1976, after partying in the beach town of Oceanside, California, with her new boyfriend, Allan "Butch" Koven, and others the night before, Jones, 18, was found dead in an upstairs bedroom of a house belonging to the father of a 14-year-old friend named Helen Hennessy. Others at the party ranged in age from 12 to 22, as police later determined. The coroner's report listed Jones' death as a drug overdose, later ruled accidental; cocaine, PCP, Quaalude, and Seconal were found in her body during an autopsy toxicology examination. The police report also indicated a small vial of blue liquid next to Jones at the scene, which was never identified. The coroner who examined Jones reported she died from one of the most severe drug overdoses he had ever seen.

Jones was given a small, private service. She was cremated and her ashes were scattered over the Pacific Ocean. She left $63,000 in cash and more than $100,000 in savings bonds when she died (equivalent to $ today).

Investigation 

The investigation of Dr. Don Carlos Moshos began as a separate matter. Occupants in the same building as Moshos's office had reported the unusual activity of patients waiting in long lines outside of his practice. According to a Torrance Police Department report, Moshos was writing over 100 prescriptions per day. A KABC local news team visited his office and found it filled with young people, some of whom had been waiting over three hours to be seen by Moshos. Wayne Staz, the reporter who initiated the visit, alleged that prescriptions could be obtained with $5.00 and "simply showing identification".

Six days after Jones's death, Moshos was arrested at his office in Torrance and charged with illegally prescribing Seconal to Jones, among other drugs-for-profit charges from a concurrent undercover criminal investigation. An envelope with Moshos's business address was present at Jones' scene of death, specifying a drug found in Anissa's toxicology report (Seconal), its dosage (1.5 gr), quantity (50), and the recipient's last name (Jones). Moshos was charged with 11 offenses; while awaiting trial, Moshos died on December 27, 1976, four months after Jones. Although the murder charges were dropped before his death, Moshos's estate was sued by Jones's surviving family for $400,000; in July 1979, the verdict found him 30% liable and Jones 70% responsible for her death, and the resulting judgment was reduced to $79,500 ($ today).

Anissa's father, John Paul Jones, died on March 7, 1974, at age 44. On March 15, 1984, Jones's brother, Paul, died of a drug overdose. He was 24. Jones's mother, Mary Paula Jones, died in Detroit, Michigan, of natural causes on January 14, 2012.

Filmography

References

External links

 

Accidental deaths in California
Actresses from Indiana
American child actresses
American film actresses
American television actresses
American people of Lebanese descent
Cocaine-related deaths in California
Drug-related deaths in California
1958 births
1976 deaths
20th-century American actresses
People from Lafayette, Indiana